A penstock is a sluice or gate or intake structure that controls water flow, or an enclosed pipe that delivers water to hydro turbines and sewerage systems. The term is inherited from the earlier technology of mill ponds and watermills.

Hydroelectric systems and dams
Penstocks for hydroelectric installations are normally equipped with a gate system and a surge tank. They can be a combination of many components such as anchor block, drain valve, air bleed valve, and support piers depending on the application. Flow is regulated by turbine operation and is nil when turbines are not in service. Penstocks, particularly where used in polluted water systems, need to be maintained by hot water washing, manual cleaning, antifouling coatings, and desiccation.

The term is also used in irrigation dams to refer to the channels leading to and from high-pressure sluice gates.

Penstocks are also used in mine tailings dam construction. The penstock is usually situated fairly close to the center of the tailings dam and built up using penstock rings. These control the water level, letting the slimes settle out of the water. This water is then piped under the tailings dam back to the plant via a penstock pipeline.

Watermills

Penstocks are often used at mill sites to control the flow of water through the mill wheel, or to pen water into a mill pool.

Similar structures

Similar structures which are not enclosed are head races or leats (non elevated), and flumes (elevated).

Hydraulics
Penstocks are commonly used in water management systems such as surface water drainage and foul water sewers. Penstocks provide a means of isolation of flows and regulate the flow of water while delivering it to waste management facilities or power plants.

Landfills
Penstocks are incorporated into the surface water management systems (drainage) of many landfill sites. Attenuation lagoons are constructed in order to store storm water, limiting the discharge from the site to pre-development rate (green field rate). Penstocks are installed at the outfall from the lagoon so that in the rare event that the surface water becomes contaminated the penstock may be closed. This will have the effect of isolating the site from the watercourse, preventing contamination of the environment.

References

External links
Penstock cross-sections for the Grand Coulee Dam
U.S. Department of Energy Hydropower Basics

Aqueducts
Hydroelectric power stations
Water management in mining